Septal panniculitis is a condition of the subcutaneous fat affecting the layer of adipose tissue that lies between the dermis and underlying fascia, of which there are two forms: acute erythema nodosum and chronic erythema nodosum.

See also 
 Erythema nodosum
 List of cutaneous conditions
 Panniculitis
 Skin lesion

References 

Conditions of the subcutaneous fat